Ausir may refer to:

Ausir, one of the forms of the name of Osiris, an ancient Egyptian god
Ausir, a pseudonym used by Polish translator Paweł Dembowski